The 1861 Massachusetts gubernatorial election was held on November 5.

Governor John Albion Andrew was re-elected to a second term in office over Democratic Mayor of Worcester Isaac Davis.

General election

Candidates
John Albion Andrew, Governor of Massachusetts since 1861 (Republican)
Isaac Davis, Mayor of Worcester (Democratic)

Results

References

Governor
1861
Massachusetts
November 1861 events